Vitaly Rudenchik (born 21 February 1982) is a Bulgarian biathlete. He competed in the men's 20 km individual event at the 2006 Winter Olympics.

References

1982 births
Living people
Bulgarian male biathletes
Olympic biathletes of Bulgaria
Biathletes at the 2006 Winter Olympics
Sportspeople from Prague
21st-century Bulgarian people